Choices: The Album is the fifth studio album by American hip hop group Three 6 Mafia. Released as the soundtrack for the direct-to-video movie Choices: The Movie. The album was released on August 28, 2001, by Loud Records, Relativity Records and Hypnotize Minds. The Song "They Don't F*uck Wit U" is featured on the Soundtrack for "Exit Wounds".

Track listing
All tracks are produced by DJ Paul and Juicy J

References

Film soundtracks
2001 soundtrack albums
Three 6 Mafia soundtracks
Loud Records soundtracks
Relativity Records soundtracks
Albums produced by DJ Paul
Albums produced by Juicy J
Gangsta rap soundtracks